Dubsúilech Ó Maolconaire was a member of the Ó Maolconaire family of Connacht, who served as historians and poets to the Síol Muireadaigh and their rulers, the Ó Conchubhair Kings of Connacht.

He appears to have been chief ollamh of Connacht, and thus presumably that of the Síol Muireadaigh. However, the entry in the Annals of Connacht is somewhat ambiguous: 
"It was in this year that the reign of the ollavs Dubshuilech and Dunlang  O Mailchonaire came to an end, and Tanaide Mor son of Duinnin son of  Nede son of Conaing Buide O Mailchonaire took his seat in the Ollav's  Chair of the province of Connacht. In the words [of the poet]: 'Tanaide  the teacher, a learned ollav, son of Duinnin, spent forty famous years  on the floor of Liss Lerthaile.'"
The possibility therefore exists that Dubsúilech and Dunlang held the post jointly during their lives. Their successor was a son of a previous Ollamh, Dúinnín Ó Maolconaire.

References
General

The Encyclopaedia of Ireland 2003; .
 Mac Dermot of Moylurg: The Story of a Connacht Family Dermot Mac Dermot, 1996.
A New History of Ireland VIII: A Chronology of Irish History to 1976 - A Companion to Irish History Part I edited by T.W. Moody, F.X. Martin and F.J. Byrne, 1982. 
The Celebrated Antiquary Nollaig O Muralie, Maynooth, 1996.
Irish Leaders and Learning Through the Ages Fr. Paul Walsh, 2004. (ed. Nollaig O Muralie).
Specific

External links
List of Published Texts at CELT — University College Cork's Corpus of Electronic Texts

13th-century deaths
1270 deaths
13th-century Irish historians
13th-century Irish poets
People from County Roscommon
Year of birth unknown
Irish male poets
Irish-language writers